Nikolai Lvovich Lugansky (born 26 April 1972) is a Russian pianist.

Early life and education
Nikolai Lugansky was born on 26 April 1972 in Moscow, Russia, to research scientist parents. At the age of five, before he had learned to read music, he played a Beethoven piano sonata learned completely by ear. He studied piano at the Moscow Central Music School and the Moscow Conservatory. His teachers included Tatiana Kestner, Tatiana Nikolayeva and Sergei Dorensky.

Career

During the 1980s and early 1990s, Lugansky won prizes at numerous piano competitions, most notably the Silver Medal at the Tchaikovsky International Piano Competition in 1994 (no first prize was awarded). At the same time he began to make recordings on the Melodiya (USSR) and Vanguard Classics (Netherlands) labels. His performance at the Winners' Gala Concert of the 10th International Tchaikovsky Competition was recorded and released on the Pioneer Classics label, on both CD and video laser disc formats. This was followed by more recordings for Japanese labels. He went on to make recordings for Warner Classics, Erato Records, PENTATONE, Onyx Classics, Deutsche Grammophon, and Naïve Records. In 2018, Lugansky signed an exclusive recording contract with Harmonia Mundi.

Lugansky has performed together with Vadim Repin, Alexander Kniazev, Anna Netrebko, Joshua Bell, Yuri Bashmet, Vadim Rudenko, Mischa Maisky and Leonidas Kavakos, among others. He has collaborated with conductors such as Riccardo Chailly, Christoph Eschenbach, Vladimir Fedoseyev, Valery Gergiev, Neeme Järvi, Kurt Masur, Mikhail Pletnev, Gennady Rozhdestvensky, Yuri Simonov, Leonard Slatkin, Tugan Sokhiev, Vladimir Spivakov, Yevgeny Svetlanov, Yuri Temirkanov and Edo de Waart.

In addition to performing and recording, Lugansky teaches at the Moscow Conservatory.

Personal life
Lugansky lives in Moscow with his wife and three children.

Awards

Competition prizes
 First Prize, All-Union Competition in Tbilisi (1988)
 Silver Medal, 8th International Bach Competition in Leipzig (1988)
 Second Prize, Rachmaninov Competition in Moscow (1990)
 Best pianist, International Summer Academy "Mozarteum" in Salzburg, Austria (1992)
 Silver Medal, 10th International Tchaikovsky Competition in Moscow (1994)

Other awards
 Ernest Neizvestny Private Charity Fund Award (1994)
 International Terence Judd Award (1995)
 Diapason d'Or (2000, 2001 and 2002)
 Preis der deutschen Schallplattenkritik (2003)
 Named "Honoured Citizen of Ivanovka"  in Tambov, Russia (2004)
 Named "Honoured Artist of the Russian Federation" (2005)
 Echo Klassik Award (2005)
 Echo Klassik Award (2007)
 BBC Music Magazine Award (2011)
 Echo Klassik Award (2013)
 People’s Artist of Russia (2013)
 Sergei Rachmaninov International Award (2016)
 State Prize of the Russian Federation (2019)

References

External links

Official Website of Nikolai Lugansky
HarrisonParrott Artist and Project Management
Official page on Vkontakte

1972 births
Living people
Musicians from Moscow
Russian classical pianists
Male classical pianists
Moscow Conservatory alumni
21st-century classical pianists
21st-century Russian male musicians
Erato Records artists